Rico Vonck (born 12 March 1987) is a Dutch former darts player.

Career

Vonck qualified for the 2007 PDC World Darts Championship, having finished second in the Dutch Darts Federation (DDF) rankings. Michael van Gerwen had finished top of the list, but opted to play in the BDO version instead.

Vonck was only 19 years old when he won his place at the Circus Tavern. He won his first round match against world number 16 Mark Walsh, who was suffering from dartitis at the time. Vonck then went on to beat Canadian qualifier Brian Cyr in the second round but failed to win a single leg against fellow Dutchman and four-time World Champion Raymond van Barneveld in the last 16, losing 0–4.

World Championship results

PDC

2007: Third round (lost to Raymond van Barneveld 0–4)

Sources
Rico Vonck's darts database

1987 births
Living people
Dutch darts players
People from Roermond
Professional Darts Corporation former pro tour players
Sportspeople from Limburg (Netherlands)